Fernand Backes (born January 30, 1930, in Differdange) was a boxer from Luxembourg. Backes was member of the Luxembourgish Olympic team at the 1952 Summer Olympics in Helsinki. After a bye in the first round of the light-welterweight division, he was eliminated in the second round by Belgian Jean-Louis Paternotte. In 2008 he was promoted to the rank of Chevalier in the Order of Merit of the Grand Duchy of Luxembourg.

References

External links
Association Luxembourgeoise des Olympiens
Fernand Backes' profile at Sports Reference.com

1930 births
Living people
People from Differdange
Light-welterweight boxers
Luxembourgian male boxers
Boxers at the 1952 Summer Olympics
Olympic boxers of Luxembourg
Knights of the Order of Merit of the Grand Duchy of Luxembourg